is a chain of business hotels in Japan, founded in 1986 and expanding rapidly from the 1990s.

The company is headquartered in the Kamata section of Ōta, Tokyo, about halfway between the central wards of Tokyo and Yokohama; its name is a portmanteau of the names of Tokyo and Yokohama. It aims for uniformity in its hotels, using as many prefabricated and bulk-purchased components as possible to reduce costs. The chain is also known for almost exclusively hiring women: as of 2001, 95% of the company's workforce was female, and nearly all of its hotel managers were married women.

The company has grown rapidly, increasing its number of hotels from 61 in December 2002 to 347 in October 2022, with typical rates (as of July 2019) between 5800 and 9000 yen per night for a single room.  Nearly all its hotels are in Japan; the exceptions are 12 hotels in South Korea, as well as one hotel each in the Philippines, Mongolia, France and Germany.

Toyoko Inn has plans to build 100 hotels in Vietnam and one hotel in the New York City neighborhood of Long Island City in the coming years.

References

https://www.toyoko-inn.com/sp/hotel_list

External links

 
 

Hotel chains in Japan
Hospitality companies of Japan
Service companies based in Tokyo
Hotels established in 1986
1986 establishments in Japan
Japanese brands